Despo C. Fatta-Kassinos is a chemical and environmental engineer, academic and author. She is a professor in the Department of Civil and Environmental Engineering and the first director of Nireas-International Water Research Center (Nireas-IWRC) at the University of Cyprus (2010–2022). She has been named a Highly Cited Researcher by Web of Science, Clarivate Analytics.

Best known for her work in wastewater treatment and reuse; Fatta-Kassinos co-edited Xenobiotics in the Urban Water Cycle: Mass Flows, Environmental Processes, Mitigation, and Treatment strategies, and also authored a children's book on water titled The Secret Handbook of the Blue Circle.

Fatta-Kassinos holds an appointment as a member of the Scientific Advisory Committee of the Catalan Institute for Water Research (ICRA), the SETAC Europe Council, and the Scientific Advisory Board of the CRETUS Research Center of the University of Santiago de Compostela in Spain. She had been appointed as a member of the Educational Council of the Diplomatic Academy of the Ministry of Foreign Affairs (Cyprus). She is the section editor for "Water and wastewater treatment" of PLOS Water. She formerly was an Associate Editor and since 2022 an Editor of Water Research, and previously served as Editor-in-Chief of the Journal of Environmental Chemical Engineering since its founding in 2012 until becoming an Executive Editor in September 2022. In 2014, she became a founding member of International Ph.D. School on Advanced Oxidation Processes, member of the Scientific and Management Committee.

Education
Fatta-Kassinos received a Diploma in Chemical Engineering from the National Technical University of Athens (NTUA), Greece, in 1993, and completed a M.Sc. in Environmental Management and Education in 1995 from the European Association of Environmental Management and Education (EAEME). She then received her Ph.D. in Chemical Engineering in 1999 from NTUA. Her dissertation was titled "Development of a methodology for the estimation of the pollution level of the groundwater aquifers in the vicinity of waste disposal sites." Following this, she served as a Postdoctoral researcher for three years at NTUA between 1999 and 2003.

Career
Fatta-Kassinos began her academic career in 2003 as a lecturer in the Department of Civil and Environmental Engineering at the University of Cyprus, was appointed as an assistant professor in 2007, and an associate professor in 2015. Previously, she had been also an Invited Faculty Member at the Cyprus International Institute for Environmental and Public Health in association with the Harvard School of Public Health from 2005 until 2009. As of 2020, she is a professor in the Department of Civil and Environmental Engineering at the University of Cyprus.

Fatta-Kassinos founded Gaia, Laboratory of Environmental and Engineered Water Processes and Systems, and has been serving as its Head since 2003. She was the founding Director of the Nireas, International Water Research Center at the University of Cyprus, the first Water Research Centre in Cyprus, for over a decade. 

She is currently appointed a 2019–2024 term as the chair of the advisory board of the African Center of Excellence in Water and Environment Research (ACEWATER), based in Nigeria.

Research
Fatta-Kassinos has worked in the area of environmental science and authored numerous publications. Her research spans the fields of wastewater treatment and reuse, with a particular focus on Advanced Oxidation Processes (AOP), and on the development, and use of techniques for identifying contaminants of emerging concern in wastewater and crops, as well as antimicrobial resistance in the environment and wastewater technical systems. Among various honors, she is the recipient of the highest national research recognition award, the Nikos Symeonides National Research Award, and most recently was awarded the Noack Laboratorien Outstanding Science Career Award by the Society of Environmental Toxicology and Chemistry (SETAC). She was the Proposer, and Chair of the European COST Action NEREUS ES1403, "New and emerging challenges and opportunities in wastewater reuse" from 2014 till 2018, and later, became the Project coordinator of "Antibiotics and mobile resistance elements in wastewater reuse applications: risks and innovative solutions" (ANSWER) Project.

Wastewater management
Fatta-Kassinos conducts research on wastewater issues with a scientific focus on the fate and risk of contaminants of emerging concern, such as pharmaceuticals, and development of new advanced treatment methods for their effective removal. Her early work presented the occurrence patterns, source, and fate of pharmaceuticals in water and wastewater, and investigated the effectiveness of numerous advanced oxidation processes (AOPs) technologies for the removal of residual pharmaceuticals in water bodies. Her further research extended the wastewater discipline, and discussed the unique nature, characteristics, transformations, and fate of pharmaceuticals. In particular, she has studied the chemical identification and quantification of pharmaceuticals, discussed the use of AOP processes for their removal, and analyzed the potential biological effects in aquatic matrices. Furthermore, her studies have elucidated the transformation pathways of pharmaceutical residues with regard to their presence both in wastewater-treatment plants and in water matrices. In one of her highly cited review works, she examined  the formation, fate, and effects of transformation of pharmaceutical products during photolytic processes and AOP, and  brought attention to the various factors that contribute to the lack of understanding of the scope of potential problems associated with the presence of residual pharmaceutical compounds.

Antibiotic resistance and wastewater reuse
Another important aspect of Fatta-Kassinos’ work is the investigation of antibiotic resistance, specifically the risks it poses and the most effective ways to combat it. In a 2015 joint study addressing the prevention of environmental contamination with antibiotic resistant bacteria and genes, she reported the existing knowledge gaps, and identified policy, and management options. Given the fact that conventional treatment facilities lack the design to tackle antibiotics, her research characterized the removal efficiency of antibiotics from wastewater with different treatment processes, such as advanced treatment technologies and disinfection. While indicating urban wastewater treatment plants (UWTPs) as one of the primary sources of antibiotics' release in the environment, she argued how the existence of antibiotics can lead to the selection of antibiotic resistance genes as well as antibiotic resistant bacteria (ARB). In related research, she also determined that the removal efficiency of the wastewater treatment processes, e.g., biological and chemical processes is governed by the physiological properties of the antibiotics, and the operating conditions of the treatment processes. Much of her work has evaluated the fate of ARB and ARGs in UWTPs via different treatment processes, and focused on the significance of incorporating alternative techniques, like membrane processes and advanced oxidation processes (AOPs), before the final disposal in the environment in order to reduce the risks for human health and the environment.

More recently, Fatta-Kassinos coordinated the ANSWER (ANtibioticS and mobile resistance elements in WastEwater Reuse applications: risks and innovative solutions) Project. In addition, her work, Wastewater Reuse and Current Challenges was also acknowledged in the European Commission's technical report on the development of a legislative instrument for water reuse in agricultural irrigation and aquifer recharge at EU level.

Fatta-Kassinos has performed a set of bioassays to evaluate the biological potency of treated urban wastewater. She suggested the advanced oxidation processes (AOPs) as a successful tool for the removal of organic and inorganic compounds from the urban water cycle. Having analyzed the issues associated with the discharge of treated wastewater in the environment for reuse, her work also assessed how the xenobiotic pollutants are taken up by the plants or accumulate in the soil. Afterwards, considering that reusable wastewater must be free of antibiotic compounds, she examined the application of a solar-based AOP for the antibiotic degradation, highlighted that first-order kinetics was followed, and confirmed that Ofloxacin and trimethoprim were entirely degraded. Among other research topics, her work has addressed the implications of reclaimed wastewater (RWW) use for irrigation and the development of analytical methods for tracking pharmaceutical residues in water bodies.

Awards and honors
2011 – Nikos Symeonides National Research Award, Cyprus Research Promotion Foundation 
2017 – Honored for her long-standing contribution and activity in the research area of Environmental Protection, Hellenic Open University
2018 – Highly Cited Researcher in Cross-Field, Web of Science, Clarivate Analytics
2019–2022 – Highly Cited Researcher in the field of Environment and Ecology, Web of Science, Clarivate Analytics
2020 – Scientist/Academic Woman of the Year, Madame Figaro Women of the Year Awards
2021 - Selected by the Seneca Foundation - Science and Technology Agency of the Region of Murcia in Spain, among 27 women scientists who can be an example to follow for new generations - European project MEDNIGHT - Mediterranean Researchers’ Night
2022 – Noack Laboratorien Outstanding Science Career Αward, Society of Environmental Toxicology and Chemistry (SETAC)
2023 – Selected as one of the 11 women scientists who comprise the Mediterranean Science Team of 2023, European project MEDNIGHT 2023

Bibliography

Books
Xenobiotics in the Urban Water Cycle: Mass Flows, Environmental Processes, Mitigation, and Treatment Strategies (2010) 
Wastewater Reuse and Current Challenges, The Handbook of Environmental Chemistry Series, 44, Springer, (2016) , ISSN: 1867-979X (print), ISSN: 1616-864X (electronic).
Advanced Treatment Technologies for Urban Wastewater Reuse, The Handbook of Environmental Chemistry Series, 45, Springer, (2016) , ISSN: 1867-979X (print), ISSN: 1616-864X (electronic)
The Secret Handbook of the Blue Circle (2019)  in English, Turkish and Greek (2019)

Selected articles
Nikolaou, A., Meric, S., & Fatta, D. (2007). Occurrence patterns of pharmaceuticals in water and wastewater environments. Analytical and bioanalytical chemistry, 387, 1225–1234.
Klavarioti, M., Mantzavinos, D., & Kassinos, D. (2009). Removal of residual pharmaceuticals from aqueous systems by advanced oxidation processes. Environment international, 35(2), 402–417.
Fatta-Kassinos, D., Meric, S., & Nikolaou, A. (2011). Pharmaceutical residues in environmental waters and wastewater: current state of knowledge and future research. Analytical and bioanalytical chemistry, 399, 251–275.
Rizzo, L., Manaia, C., Merlin, C., Schwartz, T., Dagot, C., Ploy, M. C., ... & Fatta-Kassinos, D. (2013). Urban wastewater treatment plants as hotspots for antibiotic resistant bacteria and genes spread into the environment: a review. Science of the total environment, 447, 345–360.
Michael-Kordatou, I., Michael, C., Duan, X., He, X., Dionysiou, D. D., Mills, M. A., & Fatta-Kassinos, D. (2015). Dissolved effluent organic matter: characteristics and potential implications in wastewater treatment and reuse applications. Water Research, 77, 213–248.
Michael-Kordatou, I., Iacovou, M., Frontistis, Z., Hapeshi, E., Dionysiou, D. D., & Fatta-Kassinos, D. (2015). Erythromycin oxidation and ERY-resistant Escherichia coli inactivation in urban wastewater by sulfate radical-based oxidation process under UV-C irradiation. Water research, 85, 346–358.
Pärnänen, K. M., Narciso-da-Rocha, C., Kneis, D., Berendonk, T. U., Cacace, D., Do, T. T., ... & Manaia, C. M. (2019). Antibiotic resistance in European wastewater treatment plants mirrors the pattern of clinical antibiotic resistance prevalence. Science advances, 5(3), eaau9124.
Karaolia, P., Michael, C., Schwartz, T., & Fatta-Kassinos, D. (2022). Membrane bioreactor followed by solar photo-Fenton oxidation: Bacterial community structure changes and bacterial reduction. Science of The Total Environment, 847, 157594.
Manoli, K., Naziri, A., Ttofi, I., Michael, C., Allan, I. J., & Fatta-Kassinos, D. (2022). Investigation of the effect of microplastics on the UV inactivation of antibiotic-resistant bacteria in water. Water Research, 222, 118906.

References

Academic staff of the University of Cyprus
National Technical University of Athens alumni
Living people
Chemical engineers